The Dwarka River  (also called Babla) is a tributary of Bhagirathi.

Course
The Dwaraka originates in Santhal Parganas in Jharkhand, flows through Deucha, and then through Mayureswar and Rampurhat police station areas of Birbhum district. It finally flows through Murshidabad district, where it joins the Bhagirathi. Total length of Dwarka river is 156.5 km.

Though a moderate river, it has several names and many small tributaries and estuaries. It flows through Kandi subdivision and near Kalyanpur (Murshidabad) this river merged with Bhagirathi. Its many backwaters and side channels also connect  with the Bhagirathi. It is a  hill stream with beds full of pebbles and yellow clay.

Deucha barrage
It is on the west side of NH 60, in Birbhum district .

See also

List of rivers of India

References

Rivers of Jharkhand
Rivers of West Bengal
Rivers of India